Alberto Rodríguez Oliver (born 26 August 1982 in Santa Coloma de Gramenet) is a Spanish professional road racing cyclist since 2005, currently riding for Grupo Nicolás Mateos-Murcia.

External links
http://www.sitiodeciclismo.net/coureurfiche.php?coureurid=14688

1982 births
Living people
Spanish male cyclists
Sportspeople from Santa Coloma de Gramenet
Cyclists from Catalonia
21st-century Spanish people